Beryozovka is a rural locality (a selo) and the administrative center of Beryozovsky District of Perm Krai, Russia. Population:

References

Rural localities in Beryozovsky District, Perm Krai